"I've Got a Feeling" is a song by the English rock band the Beatles from their 1970 album Let It Be. It was recorded on 30 January 1969 during the Beatles' rooftop concert. It is a combination of two unfinished songs: Paul McCartney's "I've Got a Feeling" and John Lennon's "Everybody Had a Hard Year". The song features Billy Preston on electric piano.

A studio take of the song, recorded about a week earlier, was released on the Anthology 3 compilation in 1996. The 2003 remix album Let It Be... Naked includes a version of the song that is a composite edit of the rooftop concert take used on Let It Be and a second attempt at the song from the same concert.

With Lennon's vocals isolated out during the production of Peter Jackson's Get Back documentary, McCartney performed the song live as a virtual duet on his 2022 Got Back tour.

Composition
Lennon's song was a litany where every line started with the word "everybody". The song had been recorded twice before by Lennon, prior to the Let It Be sessions. The first occurred in early December 1968 at Lennon's Kenwood estate on a portable cassette tape. For this, the lyric was "Everyone had a hard year" instead of the later "Everybody". Later in December 1968, with the lyric changed to "everybody," Lennon was filmed performing the song in the back garden of Kenwood. This footage was used in the Yoko Ono art film Rape: Film No. 6, which was broadcast on Austrian television on 31 March 1969.

Personnel
Personnel per Ian MacDonald

The Beatles
 Paul McCartneybass guitar, lead vocals
 John Lennonrhythm guitar, lead vocals
 George Harrisonlead guitar
 Ringo Starrdrums

Additional musicians
 Billy PrestonFender Rhodes piano

References

Sources

External links 
 

The Beatles songs
British blues rock songs
1970 songs
British hard rock songs
Songs written by Lennon–McCartney
Song recordings produced by Phil Spector
Songs published by Northern Songs